was a Japanese anison and voice actor who had performed many anime openings, including 1964 hit theme song from Obake no Q-taro and the theme from the 1972 anime series Dokonjō Gaeru. He performed songs in Godzilla vs. Gigan, and was the voice of the main character called Pero in the anime film Puss In Boots.

Ishikawa won the 1966 Japan Record Award in the Children's Song category. In 1968, he won an award at the Moscow Film Awards.

Filmography
The Wonderful World of Puss 'n Boots (1969), Pero

References

External links
 
 
 Susumu Ishikawa at GamePlaza-Haruka Voice Acting Database 

1933 births
2012 deaths
Japanese male voice actors
Actors from Tochigi Prefecture
Musicians from Tochigi Prefecture
20th-century Japanese musicians
20th-century Japanese male singers
20th-century Japanese singers